The 1988–89 New Jersey Nets season was the Nets' 13th season in the NBA. The Nets had the fourth overall pick in the 1988 NBA draft, and selected Chris Morris from the University of Auburn. During the off-season, the Nets acquired Walter Berry from the San Antonio Spurs, and acquired Mike McGee from the Sacramento Kings. Before the start of the season, the team acquired Joe Barry Carroll and Lester Conner from the Houston Rockets, while Berry was later on released to free agency midway through the season. The Nets held an 18–29 record at the All-Star break, but struggled for the remainder of the season, posting an 8–27 record, and finishing fifth in the Atlantic Division with a 26–56 record. 

Roy Hinson averaged 16.0 points and 6.4 rebounds per game, while Morris averaged 14.1 points, 5.2 rebounds and 1.3 steals per game, was selected to the NBA All-Rookie Second Team, and finished in third place in Rookie of the Year voting, and Buck Williams provided the team with 13.0 points and 9.4 rebounds per game. In addition, Carroll averaged 14.1 points, 7.4 rebounds and 1.3 blocks per game, while McGee contributed 13.0 points per game, second-year guard Dennis Hopson provided with 12.7 points per game, and Conner contributed 10.3 points, 7.4 assists and 2.2 steals per game. 

Following the season, Williams was traded to the Portland Trail Blazers, and McGee was released to free agency.

Draft picks

Roster

Regular season

Season standings

z – clinched division title
y – clinched division title
x – clinched playoff spot

Record vs. opponents

Awards and records
 Chris Morris, NBA All-Rookie Team 2nd Team

Transactions
 June 23, 1988: Dwayne Washington drafted in the NBA expansion draft by the Miami Heat.
 July 1, 1988: Released Dudley Bradley.
 July 19, 1988: Signed Anthony Bowie as a free agent.
 August 10, 1988: Orlando Woolridge signed as an unrestricted free agent with the Los Angeles Lakers.
 August 29, 1988: Traded Dallas Comegys to the San Antonio Spurs for Walter Berry.
 August 30, 1988: Signed Kevin Williams as a free agent.
 August 31, 1988: Waived Otis Birdsong.
 October 4, 1988: Signed Frank Johnson as a free agent.
 October 31, 1988: Traded a 1991 2nd round draft pick and a 1996 2nd round draft pick to the Sacramento Kings for Mike McGee.
 November 1, 1988: Waived Anthony Bowie.
 November 2, 1988: Traded Tony Brown, Frank Johnson, Tim McCormick and Lorenzo Romar to the Houston Rockets for Joe Barry Carroll and Lester Conner.
 November 23, 1988: Signed Ron Cavenall as a free agent.
 December 27, 1988: Waived Ron Cavenall.
 January 30, 1989: Waived Walter Berry.
 January 31, 1989: Signed Bill Jones as a free agent.
 February 7, 1989: Signed Corey Gaines to the first of two 10-day contracts.
 February 27, 1989: Signed Corey Gaines as a free agent.
 March 3, 1989: Waived Kevin Williams.

Player Transactions Citation:

References

New Jersey Nets season
New Jersey Nets seasons
New Jersey Nets
New Jersey Nets
20th century in East Rutherford, New Jersey
Meadowlands Sports Complex